A number of Latin translations of modern literature have been made to bolster interest in the language. The perceived dryness of classical literature is sometimes a major obstacle for achieving fluency in reading Latin, as it discourages students from reading large quantities of text (extensive reading). In his preface to his translation of Robinson Crusoe, F. W. Newman writes:

Modern literature

Comic books

See also
Libri Latine redditi in Vicipaedia Latina (Wikipedia in Latin)
List of modern literature translated into dead languages
List of recent original books in Latin

Notes

Latin language
Latin-language literature
Translations into Latin